Libyan Business TV (Iqtisadia)  is a Libyan business satellite channel that is owned by Crystal Media and broadcasts mainly in the Middle East and North Africa.

Facilities
Libyan Business TV's studios are located in Amman, Jordan.

The facility consists of one large single studio which houses a number of permanent sets used for different programs.

References

External links
Libyan Business TV Website
Libyan Business TV Online Stream

Television channels and stations established in 2016
Arab mass media
Arabic-language television stations
Television stations in Libya
Economy of Libya